Bru or Brú is the surname of the following people

Antonio Brú (born 1962), Spanish theoretical physicist 
Claudio López Bru (1853–1925), Spanish businessman  
Federico Laredo Brú (1875–1946), President of Cuba from 1936 to 1940
Francisco Bru (1885–1962), Spanish footballer, referee and manager
Heðin Brú (1901–1987), pen name of the Faroese novelist and translator Hans Jacob Jacobsen
Jon Bru (born 1977), Spanish professional road bicycle racer 
Jonathan Bru (born 1985), Mauritian international footballer 
Jørgen Bru (1881–1974), Norwegian sport shooter 
Kévin Bru (born 1988), French-born Mauritian footballer 
Luis Bru (1907–?), Spanish boxer 
Luis Ortega Bru (1916–1982), Spanish sculptor and carver
Mosen Vicente Bru (1682–1703), Spanish painter
Myriam Bru (born 1932), French actress 
Raymond Bru (1906–1989), Belgian fencer
Roser Bru (1923–2021), Spanish-Chilean painter and engraver
Salvador Bru, Spanish painter
Tina Bru (born 1986), Norwegian politician
Vincent Bru (born 1955), French politician
Yannick Bru (born 1973), French rugby union coach and former player

Surnames of French origin
Surnames of Norwegian origin
Surnames of Spanish origin
Catalan-language surnames